José Luis Escobar Alas (born 10 March 1959 in Suchitoto), Archbishop of San Salvador in El Salvador, succeeded Archbishop Emeritus Fernando Sáenz Lacalle as the seventh archbishop, a successor of Archbishop Óscar Romero who was assassinated in 1980.

Archbishop Escobar served as Bishop of San Vicente since 2005, prior to his elevation as archbishop on 27 December 2008. He was previously Auxiliary Bishop (also in the diocese of San Vicente) from 2002, having entered the priesthood in 1982.  Escobar was born in the town of Suchitoto in the department of Cuzcatlán.  He studied for the priesthood at San José de la Montaña Seminary in San Salvador before entering the Seminario Mayor de Morelia in Mexico.  He later graduated with a philosophy degree from the Pontifical Gregorian University, Rome.  He was ordained a priest on August 15, 1982.

Thereafter, he was Rector of the San Vicente Diocesan Seminary before teaching at San José de la Montaña Seminary in San Salvador, after which he was appointed to the Nuestra Señora del Pilar (Our Lady of the Pillar) parish in San Vicente.  Escobar served as Vicar General of the diocese of San Vicente before being named an Auxiliary Bishop by Pope John Paul II on January 19, 2002.  He was consecrated as an Auxiliary Bishop on March 23, 2002 and then was promoted Bishop of San Vicente on July 9, 2005, where he served until becoming Archbishop of San Salvador in 2006.

In late December 2012, the Archbishop Escobar authorised the removal of the tiled ceramic mural façade of the San Salvador Cathedral, El Salvador's principal basilica, without consultation with the national government nor the artist, Fernando Llort. This resulted in the destruction of all the 2,700 tiles of the mural which depicted former archbishop Óscar Romero.

See also
 Metropolitan Cathedral of San Salvador

References

External links

Catholic-Hierarchy - José Luis Escobar Alas

1959 births
Living people
People from Cuscatlán Department
Roman Catholic archbishops of San Salvador
21st-century Roman Catholic bishops in El Salvador
Pontifical Gregorian University alumni
Salvadoran Roman Catholic bishops
Roman Catholic bishops of San Vicente